Graal may refer to:

Music
 Graal (album), 2015
 "Graal" (Medium song), 2015
 "Graal" (Ne Obvlisicaris song), 2023

Other
 , a style of glassblowing
 Graal-Müritz, a health resort by the Baltic Sea in Germany
 , an MMORPG
 GRAph ALigner (GRAAL), an algorithm for aligning two different graphs
 GraalVM, a Java virtual machine extension aiming to support more languages and execution modes
 Holy Grail, or "Graal" in older forms
 Ambassador Graal, a Tellarite character in the Star Trek: Enterprise episode "Babel One"